General elections are expected to be held in Thailand on 14 May 2023, after the 25th House of Representatives reaches its four-year term limit.

Background 
Following a political crisis in Thailand, the military staged a coup d'état in 2014, ousting the civilian caretaker government. The military junta, known as the National Council for Peace and Order (NCPO), rose to power under the leadership of Prayut Chan-o-cha as Prime Minister. In 2016, the NCPO completed the drafting of a new constitution and held a referendum to approve it. They banned criticism of the draft constitution and prohibited monitoring of the referendum. Activists against the document were arrested, detained, and prosecuted in military courts, whilst voters who expressed their intention to vote against the draft were also arrested and prosecuted by the military regime.

In 2019, after numerous delays, the junta finally held a general election on March 24. The elections were seen as a skewed race in which Prayut had an unfair advantage, with the senate wholly appointed by the junta and the constituencies redrawn last-minute. After the election, the pro-junta Palang Pracharath party formed a coalition government, with Prayut selected by the parliament for another term as Prime Minister.

Prayut began his second term as Prime Minister on 9 June 2019. According to the current constitution, a Prime Minister can only serve for a maximum of 8 years. However, the end of Prayut's term as the prime minister of Thailand is disputed, since there are many interpretations about the beginning of his term. On 30 September 2022, the Constitutional Court finally ruled that Prayut's term began in 2017 along with the new constitution, meaning that he may serve as the prime minister until 2025, if he is selected by the parliament again.

At the end of 2022 saw the split in the ruling Palang Pracharath Party between Prayut and his close associate Prawit Wongsuwan, after the latter showed accommodation towards the main opposition Pheu Thai Party. Prayut was expected to join the new United Thai Nation Party along with his loyalists in the Palang Pracharath Party. Forty politicians, including 34 incumbent MPs from both coalition and opposition camps, also resigned from their parties to join Bhumjaithai Party to increase their winning chances in this election. On 23 December 2022, Prayut announced his intention to apply for membership of the United Thai Nation Party, as well as becoming the party's sole prime ministerial candidate.

Uncertainty 
In September 2022, a cabinet minister, Chaiwut Thanakamanusorn, warned protesters, saying, "if you protest a lot, be careful, you might not get your election."

Although elections are mandated by the constitution, many Thai elections have been delayed or annulled in the past.

In the run-up to the previous election in 2019, the then ruling junta delayed the election announcement multiple times before settling on the final date.

Electoral system
Unlike the preceding 2019 election, which used a form of mixed-member proportional representation with 350 constituency seats and the remaining 150 being levelling seats, the electoral system was changed in a 2021 amendment of the constitution which restored the pre-2017 parallel voting system and removed the proportional representation mechanism.

Of the 500 members of the House of Representatives to be elected, 400 seats are elected from single-member constituencies by first-past-the-post voting (an increase of 50), and 100 party-list seats—filled separately and no longer serving as levelling seats—are voted on in a separate ballot (unlike in the 2019 election, where only one vote was cast by each voter to determine both constituency and levelling seats). The change was criticised by smaller parties as the system benefits larger parties—especially the ruling Palang Pracharath Party and the main opposition party Pheu Thai, who both supported the amendment—at the expense of smaller ones, including the progressive Move Forward Party, whose predecessor Future Forward performed successfully in 2019 thanks to the proportional representation system.

Prime ministerial candidates 
Typically in parliamentary systems, the prime minister can be any member of parliament. However, under the 2017 Thai constitution, prime ministers may only be chosen from a pre-declared list of candidates. Each party may submit up to three names and must have at least 25 members in the House of Representatives to receive eligibility. Candidates do not have to be members of parliament.

Parliament's vote for Prime Minister will take place in a joint session with the 250-seat senate appointed by the junta, according to the constitution's provisional terms. In 2019, all the senators unanimously voted for then junta leader, Prayut Chan-o-cha.

As the term of the NCPO-appointed senate lasts until 2024, it is expected to exert influence into this election as well.

2022 redistribution of seats
Due to the increase of the number of members of the House of Representatives elected from single-member constituencies from 350 to 400, a redistribution of seats and redrawing of electoral boundaries was required. On 1 February 2022, the Election Commission announced its calculations that, from the total registered population of 66,171,439 as of 31 December 2021, there must be 1 member per 165,429 people. This distribution is subject to the approval of the organic law bills currently being considered by the National Assembly.

The provisional number of members of the House of Representatives to be elected from single-member constituences in each province are as follows:

Opinion polls

Preferred party

Preferred Prime Minister

Notes

References

Thailand
Elections in Thailand
Thailand
Thailand
General